Mochlus mocquardi, also known as Mocquard's writhing skink, is a species of skink. It is found in West Africa (Niger, and Nigeria) and Chad, and according to the Reptile Database, also in Sudan. It is semi-fossorial and inhabits dry savanna in microhabitats with high humidity, such as under stones and in leaf litter within the shade of large trees, in lowland areas close to water.

References

Mochlus
Skinks of Africa
Reptiles of West Africa
Reptiles of Nigeria
Vertebrates of Chad
Reptiles described in 1917
Taxa named by Paul Chabanaud